Decamethyltitanocene dichloride is an organotitanium compound with the formula Cp*2TiCl2 (where Cp* is C5(CH3)5, derived from pentamethylcyclopentadiene).  It is a red solid that is soluble in nonpolar organic solvents.  The complex has been the subject of extensive research.  It is a precursor to many organotitanium complexes.  The complex is related to titanocene dichloride, which lacks the methyl groups.

Synthesis and reactions
The complex is prepared by the reaction of titanium tetrachloride with LiCp*.  An intermediate in this synthesis is (pentamethylcyclopentadienyl)titanium trichloride.

Reduction of Cp*2TiCl2 in the presence of ethylene gives the adduct Cp*2Ti(C2H4).  The analogous Cp compound has not been prepared, a contrast that highlights the advantages of the Cp* ligand. This pentamethylcyclopentadienyl (Cp*) species undergoes many reactions such as cycloadditions of alkynes.

The dicarbonyl complex Cp*2Ti(CO)2 is prepared by reduction of Cp*2TiCl2 in the presence of carbon monoxide.

Further reading

References

Metal halides
Titanocenes
Chloro complexes